Moti Nandi; 10 July 1931 – 3 January 2010) was a Bengali writer and journalist.

Career
Moti Nandi was from Kolkata. He graduated from the University of Calcutta and became a sports journalist and worked as a sports editor in Anandabazar Patrika.

He was awarded the Lifetime Achievement award (2008) at a ceremony to mark the grand finale of the maiden edition of the Excellence in Journalism Awards.
His first short story was published in Desh weekly in 1957. His story for Pujabarshiki was in Parichoy Magazine in 1985. The character Kalabati from his novels is popular among the younger audience.

Bibliography

Novels

Shada Kham (Ananda Pub.)
Ubhoyoto Sampurno (Ananda Pub.)
Golap Bagan (Ananda Pub.)
Chaya (Ananda Pub.)
Chaya Soronite Rohini (Ananda Pub.)
Jibonto (Ananda Pub.)
Duti Tinti Ghor (Ananda Pub.)
Ditio Innings er Por (Ananda Pub.)
Duro Dristi (Ananda Pub.)
Puber Janala (Ananda Pub.)
Bonanider Bari (Ananda Pub.)
Bijolibalar Mukti (Ananda Pub.)
Malabika (Ananda Pub.)
Sibi (Ananda Pub.)
Soloke Ponero Kora (Ananda Pub.)
Sohodeber Tajmahal (Ananda Pub.)
Sobai Jache (Ananda Pub.)
Dosti Uponyas (Ananda Pub.)
Nakhatter Raat (Punascha)
Baobab (Punascha)
Dadash Bakti (Punascha)
Nayaker Probesh o Prasthan (Punascha)
Baranda
Korunabashata
Chotobabu

Works for children

Koni (Ananda Pub.)
Aloukik Dilu (Ananda Pub.)
Stopper (Ananda Pub.)
Striker (Ananda Pub.)
Kuronn [ কুড়োন ] (Ananda Pub.)
Jibon Ananta (Ananda Pub.)
Nnaran (Ananda Pub.)
Feraari (Ananda Pub.)
Tulsi (Ananda Pub.)
Dolbodoler Aage (Ananda Pub.)
Minu Chinur Trophy(Ananda Pub.)
Empiyaring
Dhankurir Kingkong (Ananda Pub.)
Biswa-jora Biswacup (Ananda Pub.)
Buro Ghora (Ananda Pub.)
Doshti Kishore Uponyas (Ananda Pub.)
Cricket er Ayne Kanun (Ananda Pub.)
Bhuli (Gangchil)
Shiba(Ananda Pub.)

Other works

Doshti Kishore Uponyas
Nonida Not Out
Striker  
Stopper
Oporajito Ananda
Dolbodoler Aage
Feraari
Shivar Phire Asa
Tulsi
Naran
Minu Chinur Trophy

Kolabati series
Kolaboti
Kolaboti Der Diet Chart
Kolaboti r Dekha Shona
Kolaboti o Khayeri
Bhuter Basay Kolaboti
Kolaboti, Apur maa o Panchu
Kolaboti o Millenium Match
Kolabotir Shaktishel

Awards

Ananda Purashkar, 1974
Sahitya Akademi Award, 1991

Cinema
One of his novels, Koni, released in 1986, was filmed with Soumitra Chatterjee in one of the lead roles. In 1978, another novel Striker was filmed as Striker with Samit Bhanja in the lead role. A small screen teleserial was also made on his novel 'Stopper'. Debesh Roychoudhury played the role of Kamal Guha on screen. Based on his novel titled "Joler Ghurni O Bokbok Shobdo" Bangladeshi film maker Animesh Aich make a film Voyangkor Sundor in 2017. The film casts Tollywood star Parambrata Chatterjee and noted Bangladeshi actress Ashna Habib Bhabna in lead roles.

Legacy
In July 2022, Mohun Bagan Athletic Club announced the club awards have been named after famous personalities to be awarded to sportspersons every year henceforth, and "Best Sports Journalist" award was renamed as Moti Nandi Award in memory of him.

External links
Short Biography of Moti Nandy

References

Bengali writers
Writers from Kolkata
Scottish Church Collegiate School alumni
University of Calcutta alumni
Recipients of the Ananda Purashkar
Recipients of the Sahitya Akademi Award in Bengali
1931 births
2010 deaths
Indian children's writers
20th-century Indian novelists
Novelists from West Bengal